Mary McDonagh (born 23 November 1849) was an Irish poet.

The daughter of a Mr. McDonagh and a Ms. McGreal, Mary was educated at Kildare Place Training College, Dublin, and frequently contributed to the Church of Ireland Parochial Mazine. She married a Mr. Pearle, and with their infant daughter, emigrated to the United States in 1881, after which date all her work was published in that country.

References

 McDonagh, Mary, p. 149, in Dictionary of Nineteenth-Century Irish Women Poets, Ann Elry Colman, Kenny's Bookshop, Galway, 1996. .

Irish poets
Irish women poets
People from County Mayo
People from County Dublin
Year of death missing
1849 births